Neoniphon is a genus of squirrelfishes.

Species
There are currently 6 recognized species in this genus:
 Neoniphon argenteus Valenciennes, 1831 (Clearfin squirrelfish)
 Neoniphon aurolineatus F. Liénard (fr), 1839 (Yellowstriped squirrelfish)
 Neoniphon marianus G. Cuvier, 1829 (Longjaw squirrelfish)
 Neoniphon opercularis Valenciennes, 1831 (Blackfin squirrelfish)
 Neoniphon pencei Copus, Pyle & Earle, 2015 (Pence's squirrelfish) 
 Neoniphon sammara Forsskål, 1775 (Sammara squirrelfish)

References

 
Marine fish genera
Taxa named by François-Louis Laporte, comte de Castelnau